Gordon Potter (born 26 October 1931) is a former English cricketer. Potter was a right-handed batsman who bowled leg break. He was born at Dormansland, Surrey, England.

Potter made his first-class debut for Sussex against Cambridge University at Fenner's in 1949. His next first-class appearance for Sussex didn't come until 1953, when he played against Cambridge University, which was also his only appearance in that season. He began to play more regularly for Sussex from 1954, making a further 52 first-class appearances for the county, the last of which came against Somerset in 1957. Hurst's role within the Sussex team was a batsman, with scored 1,313 runs at an average of 17.98, with a high score of 88. This score was one of four half centuries he made and came against Worcestershire in 1954. With his part-time leg break, he took 19 wickets at a bowling average of 45.42, with best figures of 3/29.

References

External links
Gordon Potter at ESPNcricinfo
Gordon Potter at CricketArchive

1931 births
Living people
People from Tandridge (district)
English cricketers
Sussex cricketers